Praetorian is an adjective derived from the ancient Roman office of praetor. It may refer to:

Government and military 
 Legatus (Praetorian legate), the title of a high military rank in the Roman Empire
 Praetorian Guard, a special force of skilled and celebrated troops serving as the personal guard of Roman Emperors
 Praetorian prefect, the title of a high office in the Roman Empire

Places 
 Praetorian prefecture, the largest administrative division of the late Roman Empire, above the mid-level dioceses and the low-level provinces
 Praetorian prefecture of Africa, division of the Eastern Roman Empire established after the reconquest of northwestern Africa from the Vandals
 Praetorian prefecture of Gaul, included Gaul, Upper and Lower Germany, Roman Britain, Spain and Mauretania Tingitana in Africa
 Praetorian prefecture of Illyricum, included, in its greatest expanse, Pannonia, Noricum, Crete and most of the Balkan peninsula except Thrace
 Praetorian prefecture of Italy, included the Italian peninsula, the Western Balkans, the Danubian provinces and parts of North Africa
 Praetorian prefecture of the East, included the larger part of the Eastern Roman Empire

Arts, entertainment, and media 
 Praetorian (novel), book by Simon Scarrow
 Praetorians (album), a 2008 black metal album by Naer Mataron
 Praetorians (video game), a 2003 real-time strategy computer game
 The Praetorian, a conservative newspaper at the University of California, Riverside
 Praetorian (novel), book by Simon Scarrow
 Praetorians are the primary antagonist group in The Net, 1995 film featuring Sandra Bullock

Buildings 
 Praetorian Building, one of the first high-rise buildings to be constructed in Dallas, Texas
 Praetorian Palace, a 14th-century Venetian palace in the city of Koper, Slovenia

Other uses 
 Pax Praetoriana, the relative stability of modern South Africa and its encouragement of democratic governments in other African states
 Glyphid Praetorian, an acid-spitting creature in the cooperative first-person shooter video game Deep Rock Galactic
 Praetorians Roma, an Italian rugby union team scheduled to begin play in the Magners League in 2010
 Torsus Praetorian, a 4x4 off-road bus from Ukraine